Lord of the Manor is a 1933 British comedy film directed by Henry Edwards and starring Betty Stockfeld, Frederick Kerr and Henry Wilcoxon. It was based on a play by John Hastings Turner. It was made at British and Dominion Elstree Studios as a quota film for release by Paramount Pictures.

The film's sets were designed by Wilfred Arnold.

Plot summary
During a party at a country house, a number of the guests switch their romantic partners.

Cast
 Betty Stockfeld as Barbara Fleeter
 Frederick Kerr as Sir Henry Bovey
 Henry Wilcoxon as Jim Bridge
 Kate Cutler as Lady Bovey
 Frank Bertram as George Tover
 Joan Marion as Kitty Carvell
 April Dawn as Lily Tover
 Deering Wells as Robert Bovey
 David Horne as Gen. Sir George Fleeter
 Frederick Ross as Bartlett  
 Stanley Vine as Atwick

References

Bibliography
 Chibnall, Steve. Quota Quickies: The Birth of the British 'B' Film. British Film Institute, 2007.

External links

1933 films
Films directed by Henry Edwards
1933 comedy films
British comedy films
Films set in country houses
Films set in England
Quota quickies
Films shot at British International Pictures Studios
British black-and-white films
British and Dominions Studios films
1930s English-language films
1930s British films